Kate Clark may refer to:

 Kate Clark (archaeologist), museum director and archaeologist
Kate Clark (artist), New York-based sculptor
 Kate Clark (journalist),  British journalist
 Kate Clark (writer) (1847–1926), New Zealand children's writer, poet, artist and community worker
 Kate Freeman Clark (1875–1957), American painter
 Kate Upson Clark (1851–1935), American writer
 Kiti Karaka Riwai (1870–1927), New Zealand tribal leader